Nelly Cormon (1877-1942) was a French actress. Primarily known for her stage work, later in her career she appeared in a number of silent films including the title role in Marion Delorme (1918).

Selected filmography
 The Count of Monte Cristo (1918, serial)
 Marion Delorme (1918)
 Madame Récamier (1928)

References

Bibliography
 Goble, Alan. The Complete Index to Literary Sources in Film. Walter de Gruyter, 1999.

External links

1877 births
1942 deaths
French film actresses
French stage actresses
Actors from Bourges